This is a list of notable punk rock songs that express political views.

On authoritarianism and/or the police
"Anti-Police", Demob
"At the Movies", Rock for Light, Bad Brains 
"Authority", Void
"Beat My Head Against the Wall", My War, Black Flag
"Big Takeover", Bad Brains, Bad Brains
"Bleed for Me", Plastic Surgery Disasters, Dead Kennedys
"Boss", The Crew, 7 Seconds
"Clocked In", The First Four Years, Black Flag
"Complete Control", The Clash, The Clash
"Cops for Fertilizer", The Crucifucks, The Crucifucks
"Dead Cops", Millions of Dead Cops, MDC
"Delusion & Anger", Bonecrusher, Broken Bones
"Destroy Babylon", Rock For Light, Bad Brains
"Does This System Work?", Why, Discharge
"Drunk with Power", Hear Nothing See Nothing Say Nothing, Discharge
"Fascist Pig", "Suicidal Tendencies, Suicidal Tendencies
"Fighting", Die Kreuzen, Die Kreuzen
"Fuck Authority", Land of the Free?, Pennywise
"Fuck Police Brutality", Die For The Government, Anti-Flag
"Gang Control", "Fuck World Trade", Leftöver Crack
"The Guns of Brixton", London Calling, The Clash
"Hate the Police", Hate the Police single, The Dicks 
"I Against I", I Against I, Bad Brains 
"I and I Survive", Rock For Light, Bad Brains
"It's Like...", Bonecrusher, Broken Bones
"I Won't Subscribe", Hear Nothing See Nothing Say Nothing, Discharge
 Killing in the Name, Rage Against the Machine, Rage Against the Machine
"L.A.P.D.", Ignition, The Offspring
"Living in the USA", Horse Bites Dog Cries, D.I.
"London Calling", The Clash
"The Murder of Liddle Towers", Angel Dust, Angelic Upstarts
"March of the Dogs", Underclass Hero, Sum 41
"Master Celebrator", Out of Bounds, No Fun at All
"No", The Day the Country Died, Subhumans
"No Martyr", Avengers, Avengers
"No Values", Jealous Again, Black Flag 
"Officer", Energy, Operation Ivy
"One Dead Cop", Fuck World Trade, Leftöver Crack
"...To Be a Ghost", WORRY, Jeff Rosenstock
"Pay to Cum", Bad Brains, Bad Brains 
"Police Bastard", Police Bastard, Doom
"Police Beat", The Kids Will Have Their Say, SS Decontrol
"Police Oppression", Angel Dust, Angelic Upstarts
"Police Story", The Partisans, The Partisans
"Police Story", Damaged, Black Flag
"Police Truck", Give Me Convenience or Give Me Death, Dead Kennedys
"Police Violence", The American Dream Died, Agnostic Front
"Question Authority", Wild In The Streets, Circle Jerks 
"The Regulator", Bad Brains, Bad Brains
"Say Goodbye" "Revolution Radio", Green Day
"So You Wanna be a cop", Baby Jesus, Sliced Up in the Manger, Leftöver Crack
"Stand Up", Dem Bones, Broken Bones
"Stars And Stripes", Wild In The Streets, Circle Jerks 
"State Violence State Control", Never Again, Discharge
"Supertouch", Bad Brains, Bad Brains
"S.P.G.", Punks Not Dead, The Exploited
"Spytaj milicjanta" Underground Out of Poland, Dezerter 
"S.U.S.", The Crack, The Ruts
"Take Back The Power", The Interrupters, The Interrupters
"This Hope", Die Kreuzen, Die Kreuzen
"Under Your Authority", Destroy What Destroys You, Against All Authority
"Warning", Warning, Green Day
"Warning", Warning: Her Majesty's Government Can Seriously Damage Your Health, Discharge 
"Wealth Rules", Dem Bones, Broken Bones
"We Don't Need Freedom", Paganicons, Saccharine Trust
"Who's To Blame", Dem Bones, Broken Bones
"World Up My Ass", Group Sex, Circle Jerks
"INGLEWOOD/3",Strength in Numb333rs, Fever 333

On consumerism
"21st Century Digital Boy" Against the Grain, Stranger than Fiction, Bad Religion
"Adversity", The Subhumans, Subhumans
"Americana", Americana, The Offspring
"...And Now Back to Our Programming", ...And Now Back to Our Programming, Aus-Rotten
"...And we thought nation-states were a bad idea", Less Talk, More Rock, Propagandhi
"Artificial Life", Energy, Operation Ivy
"Cashing In", Out of Step, Minor Threat
"The Consumer's Song", A New Kind of Army, Anti-Flag
"Consumo Gusto", Que Corra La Voz, Ska-P
"Corruption", Rancid, Rancid
"Customer", Up The Workers, Thee Faction
"Don't Need It", Bad Brains, Bad Brains
"Entertainment", Appeal To Reason, Rise Against
"Grandma's Footsteps", No Rest For The Wicked, New Model Army
"Greater Omaha", Read Music/Speak Spanish , Desaparecidos
"Know Your Product", Eternally Yours, The Saints
"Land Of Endless Greed", True North (album), Bad Religion
"Lost in the Supermarket", London Calling, The Clash
"Mad At The Company", Paganicons, Saccharine Trust
"Merchandise", Repeater (album), Fugazi
"Panic In the Supermarket", Millennia Madness, Citizen Fish
"Prayer of the Refugee", The Sufferer and the Witness, Rise Against
"Rip Van Disney", Midget Gems, Bus Station Loonies
 "Saturday Night Holocaust", Give Me Convenience or Give Me Death, Dead Kennedys
"Sell You Beautiful", The Resignation, RX Bandits
"Steal This Record", Steal This Record, The Suicide Machines
"Strength Thru Shopping", Audacity of Hype, Jello Biafra and the Guantanamo School of Medicine
"The Product", "Buzz or Howl Under the Influence of Heat", Minutemen
"Troops of Tomorrow", The Exploited
"This Business Is Killing Me", Pleasant Dreams, Ramones
"This Is the End (For You My Friend)", For Blood and Empire, Anti-Flag
"Ugly Desires", 24 Hour Roadside Resistance, Against All Authority
"Unknown", Hardcore '81, D.O.A.
"How Much Is Enough?", Suffer, Bad Religion

On drug legalisation
"Cannabis", El vals del obrero, Ska-P
"Herojuana", Pump Up the Valuum, NOFX
"Jimmy Jazz", London Calling, The Clash
"Julie's Been Working for the Drug Squad"", Give 'Em Enough Rope, The Clash
"My Congressman", Lucky, Fifteen
"Oxy Moronic", First Ditch Effort, NOFX
Howling at the Moon (Sha-La-La), Too Tough to Die - Ramones, rare venture into protest music from a mostly apolitical band criticizing the legal status of marijuana at the time.

On environmentalism and animal rights
"Acid Rain", Volume 2 (Reagan Youth album), Reagan Youth
"Anarcho - Pie", In Defence of Our Earth, Oi Polloi
"Belly Full of Lies", For Your Ego's Sake, Dead Silence
"Blinded By Science", Not So Brave, Flux of Pink Indians
"Cesspool In Eden", Bedtime for Democracy, Dead Kennedys
"Chicken Squawk", Millions of Dead Cops, MDC
"Clams Have Feelings Too", Pump Up the Valuum, NOFX
"Collapse (Post-Amerika)", Appeal to Reason, Rise Against
"DDT", Battle Hymns, Suicide Machines
"The Debate Is Over (If You Want It)", American Spring, Anti-Flag
"Don't Kill the Animals", Nina Hagen and Lene Lovich
"The Eco-Terrorist In Me", The Black Market, Rise Against
"Eden's Demise", Firestorm (EP), Earth Crisis
"Evolution", EP-LP, Subhumans
"Flesh and Blood", Free Souls in a Trapped Environment, Citizen Fish
"Flesh of Another", Antischism, Antischism
"Gaia Bleeds (Make Way For Man)", This Will Be the Death of Us, Set Your Goals
"Greedy Bastards", Antischism, Antischism
"Here Today", The Punk Terrorist Anthology, Nausea
"Human(e) Meat [The Flensing of Sandor Katz]", Supporting Caste, Propagandhi
"Ignorance Is Bliss", Brain Drain, Ramones
"Kyoto Now!", The Process of Belief, Bad Religion
"Leave it Behind", Leche Con Carne, No Use for a Name
"Love Canal", "Public Flipper Limited Live 1980-1985", Flipper
"Mad Scientist's Ball", For Your Ego's Sake, Dead Silence
"Meat Means Murder", It's Time To See Who's Who, Conflict
"Midnight Hands", Endgame, Rise Against
"Moon over Marin", Plastic Surgery Disasters, Dead Kennedys
"Nailing Descartes To the Wall", Less Talk, More Rock, Propagandhi
"Nuclear Generators", War Profiteering Is Killing Us All, Suicide Machines
"Pathetic Humanity", ...And Now Back to Our Programming, Aus-Rotten
"Pigman", Worlds Apart, Subhumans
"Pig in a Blanket", Death Church, Rudimentary Peni
"Poison Planet", Eye For An Eye, Corrosion of Conformity
"Purina Hall of Fame", Today's Empires, Tomorrow's Ashes, Propagandhi
"Ready to Fall", The Sufferer & the Witness, Rise Against
"The Slayer", Songs to Fan the Flames of Discontent, Refused
"This is the ALF", The Ungovernable Force, Conflict
"Tough Shit Mickey", Increase the Pressure. Conflict
"Until It's Gone, The Daily Grind, No Use for a Name
"Use Your Voice", Use Your Voice, H2O
"Wait For Me", Endgame, Rise Against
"Waste", Ballads from the Revolution, Good Riddance
"Whale Song", In Defence of Our Earth, Oi Polloi
"You Are Not Collateral Damage", Dead FM, Strike Anywhere

On government/s
"All Fall Down", For God and Country, Good Riddance
"America", Yours Truly, Sick of It All
"American Idiot", American Idiot, Green Day
"Apathy", Worlds Apart, Subhumans
"Assholes", "Plays For Lovers", Beefeater
"Audience of One", Appeal to Reason, Rise Against
"Babylon", Say It Out Loud, The Interrupters
"Below The Belt", "The Politics Of Time", Minutemen
"Big A Little A", Nagasaki Nightmare single, Crass
"Bonzo Goes to Bitburg", Animal Boy, Ramones
"Bullet", Static Age, Misfits
"Bullshit Politicians", Today's Empires, Tomorrow's Ashes, Propagandhi
"California über alles", Fresh Fruit for Rotting Vegetables, Dead Kennedys
"Condemnation", Good Politics, Thee Faction
"Confessions of an Economic Hitman", For Blood and Empire, Anti-Flag
"Conservative Friend", Singing Down the Government, Thee Faction
"Cool Britannia über alles", Midget Gems, Bus Station Loonies
"Democracy", The Adolescents, The Adolescents
"Die for the Government", Die for the Government, Anti-Flag
"District", Yours Truly, Sick of It All
"Do They Owe Us a Living?", The Feeding of the 5000, Crass
"Endgame", Endgame, Rise Against
"Fabled World", American Spring, Anti-Flag
"Fading American Dream", Fading American Dream, Street Dogs
"Fanatics", "The Punch Line", Minutemen
"Flies First Class", For God and Country, Good Riddance
"Fuck The U.S.A.", Troops of Tomorrow, The Exploited
"Fucked Up Ronnie", D.O.A.
"Fumin", Fumin''', Pardon Us
"God Save the USA", From The Ashes, Pennywise
"God Save the Queen", Never Mind the Bollocks, Here's the Sex Pistols, Sex Pistols
"Going Underground", Snap!, The Jam
"Government Flu", Plastic Surgery Disasters, Dead Kennedys
"Heads of State", Worlds Apart, Subhumans
"How Many Walls", Wolves, Rise Against
"The Idiots are Taking Over", The War on Errorism, NOFX
"I can't believe", Is This Thing Cursed?, Alkaline Trio
"I'm So Bored with the USA", The Clash, The Clash
"I'm Going to Kill the President of the United States of America", XO, Leathermouth
"If Reagan Played Disco", "Bean-Spill", Minutemen
"Kill the President", The Offspring, The Offspring
"Make America Great Again" ,  xxx , Pussy Riot
"Mother of God, Drive Putin Away" , Pussy Riot
"Murder the Government", Fuck the Kids 7-inch/So Long and Thanks for All the Shoes, NOFX
"'Merican", "Cool To Be You", Descendents
" No Security Chaos U.K. 
"Perfect Government", Punk in Drublic, NOFX
"Politics", Breaking Things, All (band)
"Porno, Sex, Drugs, Lies, Money, and Your Local Government", Day of the Death, Death by Stereo
 "Remote Control", The Clash, The Clash
"Resisting Tyrannical Government", Less Talk, More Rock, Propagandhi
"Sam Is Your Leader", "Midnight Madness and Beyond, GBH
"Sing Along With the Patriotic Punks", If Looks Could Kill, I'd Watch You Die, Death by Stereo
"Stars and Stripes of Corruption", Frankenchrist, Dead Kennedys
"Stuff Is Messed Up", Rise and Fall, Rage and Grace, The Offspring
"Thatcher Fucked The Kids", "Love Ire & Song + the First Three Years", Frank Turner
"Welcome To The Breakdown", Wolves, Rise Against
"There's No 'I' In Team", Bound by Ties of Blood and Affection, Good Riddance
"Turncoat", The Terror State, Anti-Flag
"USAHoles", Wolves in Wolves' Clothing, NOFX
"We Called it America", Coaster, NOFX
"When You Don't Control Your Government, People Want to Kill You", The Terror State, Anti-Flag
"Woman in Disguise", Reason Why?, Angelic Upstarts

On work, class and class struggle
"A People's History of the World", Less Talk, More Rock, Propagandhi
"Biggest Lie," The Feel Good Record of the Year, No Use for a Name
"Broken Dreams, Inc", "Nowhere Generation", Rise Against
"Bourgeois Fascist Pig", "Kill from the Heart", Dicks
"Career Opportunities", The Clash, The Clash
"Class War", The Dils; D.O.A.
"Clampdown", London's Calling, The Clash
"Creosote Ideas", New Sense, The Ethical Debating Society
"Disparity By Design", Endgame, Rise Against
"Employers' Blacklist" (aka "National Insurance Blacklist"), Suburban Rebels, The Business
"Employment", Good Politics, Thee Faction
"Eton Rifles", Setting Sons, The Jam
"Fake Contest", "What Makes a Man Start Fires?", Minutemen
"Forced Labor", "Wild in the Streets", Circle Jerks
"Fuck You", Oi! This Is Streetpunk, Volume Two, Rancid
"God Save the Queen", Never Mind The Bollocks, Sex Pistols
"Golden Parachutes", Payola , Desaparecidos
"Greater Omaha", Read Music/Speak Spanish , Desaparecidos 
"Jesus of Suburbia", American Idiot, Green Day 
"Misguided Memories", "Rabid Reaction", The Freeze
"Minority", "Warning", Green Day
"Nowhere Generation", "Nowhere Generation", Rise Against
"Plight", "What Makes a Man Start Fires?", Minutemen
"Sell Or Be Sold", "What Makes a Man Start Fires?", Minutemen
"Spoken Word Piece", "3-Way Tie (For Last)", Minutemen
"The Daily Grind", "The Daily Grind", No Use for a Name
"The Only Minority", "What Makes a Man Start Fires?", Minutemen
"The Process", "The Politics Of Time", Minutemen
"The Struggle", "The Punch Line", Minutemen
"To Have and to Have Not", Life's a Riot with Spy vs Spy, Billy Bragg
"Two Million Voices", 2,000,000 Voices, Angelic Upstarts
"Working Men Are Pissed", "The Politics Of Time", Minutemen
"Y.O.P.", The Exploited
"Saint George of ASDA", Shriving Drawers

On war and militarism
"1 Trillion Dollar$", For Blood and Empire, Anti-Flag
"20 Dollar Nosebleed", Folie à Deux, Fall Out Boy
"21 Guns", 21st Century Breakdown, Green Day
"911 for Peace", Mobilize, Anti-Flag
"All Good Soldiers", Recipe For Hate, Bad Religion 
"America", Agent Orange single, Agent Orange 
"The American In Me", Avengers, Avengers
"A New Kind Of Army", A New Kind Of Army, Anti-Flag
"Annihilation No.3", Dem Bones, Broken Bones
"Armalite Rifle", Damaged Goods single, Gang Of Four
"Army Life", Punks Not Dead, The Exploited
"Atomic Garden", Generator, Bad Religion
"Back Against The Wall", Group Sex, Circle Jerks
"Back to the World", Back to the World, Street Dogs
"Banana Split Republic", International P.E.A.C.E. Benefit Compilation, False Prophets 
"Blackeye", Blackeye single, Tin Pot Operation
"Bleed For Me", Plastic Surgery Disasters, Dead Kennedys
"Blood-Red, White and Blue", Revolutions per Minute, Rise Against
"The Blood Runs Red", Hear Nothing See Nothing Say Nothing, Discharge 
"Charity", Free Souls in a Trapped Environment, Citizen Fish
"City Fodder", Dem Bones, Broken Bones
"Civil War", Dem Bones, Broken Bones
"Colors", "What Makes a Man Start Fires?", Minutemen
"Courage", "3-Way Tie (For Last)", Minutemen
"Cries Of Help", Hear Nothing See Nothing Say Nothing, Discharge 
"Death Is Imminent", Bonecrusher, Broken Bones
"Depleted Uranium Is A Warcrime, For Blood And Empire, Anti-Flag
"Four Minute Warning, Chaos U.K.
"Fight War, Not Wars", Stations of the Crass, Crass 
"Final Transmission", Fading American Dream, Street Dogs
"Firecracker", Suburban Teenage Wasteland Blues, Strung Out
"Generals", Strawberries, The Damned 
"Guns Of Revolution", Condition Red, Red Rockers
"Hero of War", Appeal To Reason, Rise Against
"History Defeats", All the Best Songs Rarities Vol. 2: The Originals, No Use for a Name
"Holiday", American Idiot, Green Day
"I Have...", Paganicons, Saccharine Trust
"Imminent War", Horse Bites Dog Cries, D.I.
"Just Another Soldier", "3-Way Tie (For Last)", Minutemen
"Killing Machine", The Partisans, The Partisans
"King Of The Hill", "Project Mersh", Minutemen
"Kinky Sex Makes the World Go Around", Give Me Convenience or Give Me Death, Dead Kennedys
"Last Goodbye", Living In Darkness, Agent Orange
"Last Night Another Soldier", 2,000,000 Voices, Angelic Upstarts
"Let them Eat War", The Empire Strikes First, Bad Religion 
"Let's Go", End Of The Century, The Ramones
"Let's Have A War", The Record, Fear
"Letter From Uncle Sam", The '90s Suck and So Do You, Angry Samoans
"M-16", Milo Goes To College, Descendents 
"Major General Despair", Christ – The Album, Crass 
"Making The Bombs", Wonderful, Circle Jerks
"Mania For Conquest", Why, Discharge 
"March of the Crabs", Today's Empires, Tomorrow's Ashes, Propagandhi
"Massacre Of Innocence (Air Attack)", Why, Discharge 
"Modest Proposal", Sound & Fury, Youth Brigade 
"Mother Superior", For God and Country, Good Riddance
"Not Me", Evolution, Subhumans 
"No More Of That", Inflammable Material, Stiff Little Fingers
"No Parade", "The Punch Line", Minutemen
"Nuclear Funeral", Horse Bites Dog Cries, D.I. 
"Operation Iraqi Liberation (O.I.L.)", The Terror State, Anti-Flag
"Out on Patrol", The Offspring, The Offspring
"Part III", How Could Hell Be Any Worse?, Bad Religion
"The Point Of Agony", Bonecrusher, Broken Bones
"Potshot Heard 'Round The World", Bedtime for Democracy, Dead Kennedys
"Price Of Paradise", "3-Way Tie (For Last)", Minutemen
"Rambozo the Clown", Bedtime for Democracy, Dead Kennedys
"Realities Of War", Realities of War, Discharge 
"Rock For Light", Rock For Light, Bad Brains
"Ronnie & Mags", Self Entitled, NOFX
"Sacrifice", "Gone Fishin'", Flipper
"San Patricios", State of Grace, Street Dogs
"Skate or Bate"Tales of Terror
"Split Red", "What Makes a Man Start Fires?", Minutemen
"State of Emergency", Inflammable Material, Stiff Little Fingers
"State of the Union", Siren Song of the Counter Culture, Rise Against
"Stick To Your Guns", Horse Bites Dog Cries, D.I. 
"Straw Dogs", All the Best, Stiff Little Fingers 
"Straight to Hell", Combat Rock, The Clash
"Sweet Televised Destruction", The Restoration of Chaos & Order, Against All Authority
"Suppose They Gave A War", Flipside Vinyl Fanzine Volume 1, T.S.O.L.
"Survivor Guilt", Endgame, Rise Against
"Tale of Mass Deception', Back to the World, Street Dogs
"Tehran", The Offspring (re-released as "Baghdad" in 2004)
"The American Scream", This Addiction, Alkaline Trio
"The Big Stick", "3-Way Tie (For Last)", Minutemen
"The Cheerleaders", "Project Mersh", Minutemen
"The Punch Line", "The Punch Line", Minutemen
"Their Living Is My Death", Dem Bones, Broken Bones
"They Declare It", Realities of War, Discharge 
"Time Ends", Master Killer, Merauder
"Tomahawk Cruise", The Last Words of the Great Explorer, TV Smith's Explorers
 Tommy Gun, Give 'Em Enough Rope, The Clash
"Too Young To Die", Living In Darkness, Agent Orange
"Treading Underfoot", Bonecrusher, Broken Bones
"Vietnamese Blues", "City Babys Revenge", GBH
"Visions Of War", Why, Discharge 
"Wardogs", City Baby Attacked By Rats, GBH 
"War Hero", Independence, Toxic Reasons 
"War In The East", War on 45, D.O.A. 
"War In The Head", Blasts From The Past, 7 Seconds
"War Machine Breakdown", The Restoration of Chaos & Order, Against All Authority
"Wars In Space", Plays For Lovers, Beefeater
"War's No Fairytale", Fight Back, Discharge
"Warfare", "The Punch Line", Minutemen
 "Washington Bullets", Sandinistas!, The Clash
"Wasted Life", Inflammable Material, Stiff Little Fingers 
"Waves", Evil Friends, Portugal. The Man
"What Are You Fighting For?", Sound & Fury, Youth Brigade 
"What If There's War In America", The Crew, 7 Seconds
"When Ya Get Drafted", Fresh Fruit for Rotting Vegetables, Dead Kennedys
"White People for Peace", New Wave, Against Me!
"Who's Gonna Fight in the Third World War?", Demolition War, Subhumans 
"Why?", Why, Discharge 
"World At War", Senseless Offerings, Black Market Baby
"World War", Another Kind of Blues, U.K. Subs 
"World War III", Bad Religion, Bad Religion 
"World War III", Something Better Change, D.O.A.
"You've Gotta Die for the Government", Die for the Government, Anti-Flag

 On racism and white supremacy 
"Absent Minded", The Rotten Agenda, Aus-Rotten
"Anti-Klan", "Kill from the Heart", Dicks
"Avenues And Alleyways", ...And Out Come The Wolves, Rancid
"Big Hard Man", Dem Bones, Broken Bones
"Black and White World", Battle Hymns, Suicide Machines
"Boiling", "The Punch Line", Minutemen
"Born to Die", Millions of Dead Cops, MDC
"Born Without A Mind", The Music, The Message, 7 Seconds
"Certain Kind of Monster", The Ride, Bad Cop/Bad Cop
"Community Lie", Paganicons, Saccharine Trust
"The Competition Song", The Fuse, Pennywise
"Disguises", "The Punch Line", Minutemen
"Don't Call Me White", Punk in Drublic, NOFX
"Ein Sommer nur für mich", Runter mit den Spendierhosen, Unsichtbarer!, Die Ärzte
"Fascists", "Paranoid Time", Minutemen
"Fear of a Brown Planet", Death Is My Only Friend, Death By Stereo
"Fly the Flag", Nobody's Heroes, Stiff Little Fingers
"Fuck Machine", How to Clean Everything, Propagandhi
"Fuck Nazi Sympathy", Fuck Nazi Sympathy, Aus-Rotten
"Fuck the Border", Today's Empires, Tomorrow's Ashes, Propagandhi
"Funeral Pyre", Snap!, The Jam
"Give It Back", The Incredible Shrinking Dickies, The Dickies
"Guilty of Being White", In My Eyes (EP), Minor Threat
"Hating Hate", Battle Hymns, Suicide Machines
"Hunchback", Stukas Over Disneyland, The Dickies 
"I'm Tired", Die Kreuzen, Die Kreuzen
"Kill That Nazi (In My Head)", Mad Frank's Zonal Disco, Bus Station Loonies
"Last Believer", A Comprehensive Guide to Modern Rebellion, Good Riddance
"Manzanar", CH 3 EP, Channel 3
"Mumia's Song", Mobilize, Anti-Flag
"My World", I Don't Want To Grow Up, Descendents
"Nazi Fun", "Land Of The Lost", The Freeze
"Nazi Punks Fuck Off", In God We Trust, Inc., Dead Kennedys
"Nazi Scum", In Defence of Our Earth, Oi Polloi
"Nazi White Trash", Mediocre Generica, Leftöver Crack
"No Nazi's Friend", "Kill from the Heart", Dicks
"No Reason", Destroy What Destroys You, Against All Authority
"One Law For Them", One Law For Them single, The 4-Skins
 "Only Us", Thrice
"Police Story", A New Kind of Army, Anti-Flag 
"Race Riot", Let's Wreck The Party, D.O.A.
"Racists", American Fall, Anti-Flag 
"Right Wing/White Ring", "Kill from the Heart", Dicks
"The Only Good Fascist Is A Very Dead Fascist", Less Talk, More Rock, Propagandhi
"Safe", Wig Out at Denko's, Dag Nasty
"Sascha", Kauf mich!, Die Toten Hosen
"Schrei nach Liebe", Die Bestie in Menschengestalt, Die Ärzte
"Staring at the Rude Boys", Grin & Bear It, The Ruts
"Sticks and Stones", Midget Gems, Bus Station Loonies
"Sunset on 32nd", Change is a Sound, Strike Anywhere
"Take Our Test", "Project Mersh", Minutemen
"Them and us", The Gray Race, Bad Religion
"This Machine Kills Fascists", "Underground Network", Anti-Flag
"Trash Breeds Trash", The Greatest Invention, Doom (UK band)
"Unity", Demonstrating My Style, Madball
"Unity", Energy, Operation Ivy
"White Law", Condition Red, Red Rockers
"White Minority", Jealous Again, Black Flag
"White Noise", Inflammable Material, Stiff Little Fingers
"Who We Are", non-album single, Descendents
"White Riot", The Clash, The Clash
"Willkommen in Deutschland". Kauf Mich!, Die Toten HosenOn religion
"51 Days", ¡Leche con Carne!, No Use for a Name
"Anti-Pope", Machine Gun Etiquette, The Damned
"The Answer", Generator, Bad Religion
"Atheist Anthem, Mediocre Generica, Leftöver Crack
"Atheist Peace", The Empire Strikes First, Bad Religion
"America the Beautiful", War on 45, D.O.A.
"The Best God in Show", Coaster, NOFX
"Believers", No Straight Angles, No Fun at All
"Blasphemy (The Victimless Crime)", Coaster, NOFX
"Celestial Q&A", State of Flow, No Fun at All
"Christianised Cannibals", "City Babys Revenge ", GBH
"Come Join Us", The Gray Race, Bad Religion
"Dept. Of False Hope", True North (album), Bad Religion
"Do What You Want", Suffer, Bad Religion
"Dogsnotgods", "Crossover Ministry", Iron Reagan
"East Jesus Nowhere", 21st Century Breakdown, Green Day
"Faith Alone", Against the Grain, Bad Religion
"Filler", Minor Threat, Minor Threat
"Flat Earth Society", Against the Grain, Bad Religion
"Fuck Armageddon... This is Hell", How Could Hell Be Any Worse?, Bad Religion
"Fuck the Pope", Anti-Flag
"Gay Muslims For Christ", Corporate Avenger
"God Song", Against the Grain, Bad Religion
"Haile Selassie, Up Your Ass", How to Clean Everything, Propagandhi
"Heaven Is Falling", Generator, Bad Religion
"I'm Going to Hell for This One", "Never Trust a Hippy", NOFX
"Jesus Was a Terrorist", The Sky Is Falling and I Want My Mommy, Jello Biafra & Nomeansno
"Jihad Schmihad", Corporate Avenger
"Killing for Jesus", Wonderful, Circle Jerks
"Leaving Jesusland", Wolves in Wolves' Clothing, NOFX
"Live Again (The Fall of Man)", The Empire Strikes First, Bad Religion
"Mission from God", Punk-O-Rama Vol. 10 (Originally an outtake from Ignition), The Offspring
"Moral Majority", In God We Trust, Inc., Dead Kennedys
"My God", Land of the Free?, Pennywise
"No", The Day the Country Died, Subhumans
"No Religion", Fuck Peaceville, Doom (UK band)
"No Shirt, No Shoes, No Salvation", Day of the Death, Death by Stereo
"Please Go to Heaven Now, Black Sheep of the American Dream, Death by Stereo
 "On My Teeth", Erase Me, Underoath
 "On the Cross", Art Work, The Used
"Pods and Gods", Pods and Gods, NOFX
"Prayer Of A Realist", "City Baby Attacked by Rats", GBH
"Reality Asylum", Best Before 1984, Crass
"Religion", Public Image: First Issue, Public Image Ltd
"Religion Instigates", Fight Back, Discharge
"Religion Is the Opium of the Masses", This Is Boston, Not L.A., The Proletariat
"Religious Vomit", In God We Trust, Inc., Dead Kennedys
"Religious Wars", Religious Wars, Subhumans
"Shh, It Will Be Our Little Secret", Into the Valley of Death, Death by Stereo
"Sinister Rouge", The Empire Strikes First, Bad Religion
"Skyscraper", Recipe for Hate, Bad Religion
 "Sacrilege", Crash Love (2009), AFI
 "So Beneath You", The Blood Album, AFI
"So What", The Feeding of the 5000, Crass
"Sodom, Gomorrah, Washington D.C", The People or the Gun, Anti-Flag
"Sorrow", The Process of Belief, Bad Religion
"Sorry Lad", The Big Knockover, No Fun at All
"Sucks", The Feeding of the 5000, Crass
"You Will Lose Faith", Wolves in Wolves' Clothing, NOFX
"Walking Is Still Honest", Crime as Forgiven By, Against Me!
"Warped Confessional", "Rabid Reaction", The Freeze
"Won't Somebody", The Dissent of Man, Bad Religion
"You're Wrong", "Never Trust a Hippy", NOFX

On feminism, gender equality and LGBTIQ+ rights
"Bata Motel", Penis Envy, Crass
"Bodies" Nevermind the Bollocks.., Sex Pistols
"Coming Clean", Dookie, Green Day
"Chalkline", Change is a Sound, Strike Anywhere
"Desert", Science Fiction, Brand New "Face Down", Don't You Fake It, The Red Jumpsuit Apparatus
"Fuck Machine", How To Clean Everything, Propagandhi 
"Gay Rude Boys Unite", "Mediocre Generica", Leftöver Crack
"Homophobes Are Just Pissed 'Cause They Can't Get Laid", Where Quantity Is Job #1, Propagandhi
"Hunt The She Beast", Sex Mad, NoMeansNo
"I'm a Transvest-lite", First Ditch Effort, NOFX
"King for a Day", Nimrod, Green Day
"Make It Stop (September's Children)", Endgame, Rise Against
"Live in freedom, governed by love", Fuck Peaceville, Doom (UK band)
"Operation Rescue", Against The Grain, Bad Religion
"Pro-Life Control", Pro-Life Control, Doom (UK band)
"That's So Gay", That's So Gay, Pansy Division
"Transgender Dysphoria Blues", Transgender Dysphoria Blues, Against Me!

On the flaws of the punk subculture itself (and wider youth culture)
”Anarchy For Sale”, “Bedtime For Democracy”, Dead Kennedys
"Captain Anarchy", A New Kind Of Army, Anti-Flag
”Chickenshit Conformist”, “Bedtime For Democracy”, Dead Kennedys
"Punk By The Book", Die for the Government'', Anti-Flag
"Punk Is Dead", Crass
”Punks Are A Joke”, Deathcycle
”Tribal Rival Rebel Revel”, Crass
”White Punks On Hope”,  Crass

See also 
Anarcho-punk
Animal rights and punk subculture

References

Political Punk Songs
Punk
Political songs